Dr. Mansour Omar El-Kikhia is a Libyan-American author, columnist, activist and professor of political science. Dr. El-Kikhia is currently the chair of the Department of Political Science and Geography at the University of Texas at San Antonio. He is well known for his published criticisms of Libyan leader Muammar Gaddafi.

Personal life
His father Omar Pasha Mansour El Kikhia was the first prime minister of Cyrenaica. Furthermore, his cousin, Mansour Rashid El-Kikhia, was the former Libyan Minister of Foreign Affairs.

El-Kikhia has three children: Omar, Taz and Logeain.

Footnotes

University of Texas at San Antonio faculty
Living people
Year of birth missing (living people)